Freyeria minuscula is a butterfly in the family Lycaenidae. It is found on Madagascar. The habitat consists of transformed grassland.

References

Butterflies described in 1909
Polyommatini